The Victoria’s Voice Foundation 200 presented by Westgate Resorts is a 134-lap,  NASCAR Camping World Truck Series race that takes place at Las Vegas Motor Speedway. The inaugural race was held in 2018.

History
Despite the agreement, Speedway Motorsports decided to cancel the New Hampshire Motor Speedway race and add a second race at Las Vegas Motor Speedway, to form two weekends involving each of the three national series. The race was moved from the first race of the Camping World Truck Series playoffs to the third race of the regular season. 

On March 8, 2017, it was announced that Las Vegas Motor Speedway would get a second Cup date, second Xfinity date, and second Truck date.

In 2021, the race would change sponsorship from the Westgate to the Victoria's Voice Foundation, a foundation dedicated to preventing teen drug addictions, after the founders of the foundation, David and Jackie Siegel, had their daughter, Victoria Siegel, die at the age of 18 due to a drug overdose.

In 2022, the event was moved from September to March after the track announced they would be downsizing to just one truck event.

Past winners

2018: Race extended due to a NASCAR overtime Finish.

Multiple winners (drivers)

Multiple winners (teams)

Manufacturer wins

References

External links
 

 
NASCAR Truck Series races
2018 establishments in Nevada
Annual sporting events in the United States
Recurring sporting events established in 2018
September sporting events